James Enos Clyburn (born July 21, 1940) is an American politician and retired educator serving as a Democratic member of the U.S. House of Representatives from South Carolina. He has served as House assistant Democratic leader since 2023 and from 2011 to 2019. He is a two-time majority whip, previously serving in the post from 2007 to 2011 and from 2019 to 2023.

Currently in his 16th term, Clyburn has served as the U.S. representative for  since 1993. His congressional district includes most of the majority-black precincts in and around Columbia and Charleston, as well as most of the majority-black areas outside Beaufort and nearly all of South Carolina's share of the Black Belt. Clyburn is the dean of South Carolina's congressional delegation. Since John Spratt's departure in 2011, aside from the single term served by Joe Cunningham, Clyburn has been the only Democrat in South Carolina’s congressional delegation.

Clyburn has been the third-ranking House Democrat, behind Nancy Pelosi and Steny Hoyer, since 2007, serving as majority whip behind Pelosi and Hoyer during periods of Democratic House control, and as assistant minority leader behind Pelosi and Hoyer during periods of Republican control. After the Democrats took control of the House in the 2018 midterm elections, Clyburn was reelected majority whip in January 2019 at the opening of the 116th Congress, alongside the reelected Speaker Pelosi and Majority Leader Hoyer, marking the second time the trio has served in these roles together.

In the 2022 midterm elections, Republicans gained control of the House, and Pelosi announced her retirement as leader of the House Democratic Caucus. On the same day, Hoyer announced he would not seek his leadership position. Clyburn announced that he would seek the House Assistant Democratic Leader position, rather than that of Democratic Whip. 

Clyburn played a pivotal role in the 2020 presidential election by endorsing Joe Biden three days before the South Carolina Democratic primary. His endorsement came at a time when Biden's campaign had suffered three disappointing finishes in the Iowa and Nevada caucuses and the New Hampshire primary. Biden's South Carolina win three days before Super Tuesday transformed his campaign; the momentum led him to capture the Democratic nomination and later the presidency.

Early life and education 
Clyburn was born in Sumter, South Carolina, the son of Enos Lloyd Clyburn, a fundamentalist minister, and his wife, Almeta (née Dizzley), a beautician. A distant relative of his was George W. Murray, an organizer for the Colored Farmers Alliance (CFA), who was a Republican South Carolina Congressman in the 53rd and 54th U.S. Congresses in the late 19th century. He and other black politicians strongly opposed the 1895 state constitution, which essentially disenfranchised most African-American citizens, a situation the state maintained for more than half a century until federal civil rights legislation passed in the mid-1960s.

Clyburn graduated from Mather Academy (later named Boylan-Haven-Mather Academy) in Camden, South Carolina, then attended South Carolina State College (now South Carolina State University), a historically black college in Orangeburg. He joined the Omega Psi Phi fraternity and graduated with a bachelor's degree in history.

For his first full-time position after college, Clyburn taught at C.A. Brown High School in Charleston.

Early political career
Clyburn became involved in politics during the 1969 Charleston hospital strike. After assisting the settlement of the protests at the Medical University of South Carolina, he became involved in St. Julian Devine's campaign for a seat on the Charleston city council in 1969. Clyburn came up with the campaign's slogan, "Devine for Ward Nine". When Devine won the race, he became the first African American to hold a seat on the city council since Reconstruction. Clyburn later credited that campaign as the reason he got into electoral politics.

After an unsuccessful run for the South Carolina General Assembly, Clyburn moved to Columbia to join the staff of Governor John C. West in 1971. West called Clyburn and offered him a job as his advisor after reading Clyburn's response to his loss in the newspaper. After West appointed Clyburn as his advisor, Clyburn became the first nonwhite advisor to a governor in South Carolina history.

In the aftermath of the 1968 Orangeburg massacre, when police killed three protesting students at South Carolina State, West appointed Clyburn as the state's human affairs commissioner. He served in this position until 1992, when he stepped down to run for Congress. The Orangeburg massacre and civil-rights protest predated the 1970 Kent State shootings and Jackson State killings, in which the National Guard at Kent State, and police and state highway patrol at Jackson State, killed student protesters demonstrating against the U.S. invasion of Cambodia during the Vietnam War.

U.S. House of Representatives

Elections

After the 1990 census South Carolina's district lines were redrawn. Due to prior racial discrimination before the Voting Rights Act of 1965, the Supreme Court required the 6th district, which had previously included the northeastern portion of the state, to be redrawn as a black-majority district. The 6th was reconfigured to take in most of the majority-black areas near Columbia and Charleston, as well as most of the Black Belt. Five-term incumbent Robin Tallon's home in Florence stayed in the district, but he chose to retire. Five candidates, all of whom were African American, ran for the Democratic nomination for the seat. Clyburn's campaign was led by NAACP activist Isaac W. Williams.

Clyburn won 55% of the vote in the primary, eliminating the need for a runoff. As expected, he won the general election in November handily, becoming the first Democrat to represent a significant portion of Columbia since 1965 and the first Democrat to represent a significant portion of Charleston since 1981. He was the first African-American to represent South Carolina in Congress since George W. Murray in 1893. He has been reelected 15 times with no substantive Republican opposition.

For his first 10 terms, Clyburn represented a district that stretched from the Pee Dee through most of South Carolina's share of the Black Belt, but swept west to include most of the majority-black precincts in and around Columbia and south to include most of the majority-black precincts in and around Charleston. After the 2010 census, the district was pushed well to the south, losing its portion of the Pee Dee while picking up almost all of the majority-black precincts near Beaufort and Hilton Head Island (though not taking in any of Beaufort or Hilton Head themselves). The reconfigured 6th was no less Democratic than its predecessor. In all its incarnations as a black-majority district, it has been dominated by black voters in the Columbia and Charleston areas, and for much of that time has been the only safe Democratic district in the state.

In 2008, Clyburn defeated Nancy Harrelson, 68% to 32%. In 2010, he defeated Jim Pratt, 65% to 34%. In 2012, Clyburn defeated Anthony Culler, 73% to 25%.

Tenure

Party leadership

Clyburn was elected vice-chairman of the House Democratic Caucus in 2003, the caucus's third-ranking post. He became chair of the House Democratic Caucus in early 2006 after caucus chair Bob Menendez was appointed to the Senate. After the Democrats won control of the House in the 2006 election, Clyburn was unanimously elected Majority Whip in the 110th Congress.

Clyburn would have faced a challenge from Democratic Congressional Campaign Committee chair Rahm Emanuel, but Speaker-elect Nancy Pelosi persuaded Emanuel to run for Democratic Caucus chair. Clyburn was interviewed by National Public Radio's Morning Edition on January 12, 2007, and acknowledged the difficulty of counting votes and rallying the fractious Democratic caucus while his party held the House majority.

In the 2010 elections, the Democrats lost their House majority. Pelosi ran for Minority Leader in order to remain the House party leader, while Clyburn announced that he would challenge Steny Hoyer, the second-ranking House Democrat and outgoing Majority Leader, for Minority Whip. Clyburn had the support of the Congressional Black Caucus, which wanted to keep an African-American in the House leadership, while Hoyer had 35 public endorsements, including three standing committee chairs. On November 13, Pelosi announced a deal whereby Hoyer would remain Minority Whip, while a "number three" leadership position styled Assistant Leader would be created for Clyburn. The exact responsibilities of Clyburn's assistant leader office were unclear, though it was said to replace the Assistant to the Leader post previously held by Chris Van Hollen, who had attended all leadership meetings but was not in the leadership hierarchy.

On November 28, 2018, Clyburn was elected to serve his second stint as House Majority Whip.

Ideology
Clyburn is regarded as liberal in his political stances, actions and votes. In 2007 the National Journal ranked him the 77th most liberal U.S. representative, with a score of 81, indicating that the conductors of this study found his voting record to be more liberal than 81% of other House members, based on their recent voting records.

Clyburn has established liberal stances on health care, education, organized labor and environmental conservation issues, based on his legislative actions as well as evaluations and ratings by pertinent interest groups.

Healthcare

In 2009, Clyburn introduced the Access for All Americans Act. The $26 billion sought by the Act would provide funding to quadruple the number of community health centers in the US that provide medical care to uninsured and low-income citizens.

The American Public Health Association, the American Academy of Family Physicians, The Children’s Health Fund, and other health care interest groups rate Clyburn highly based on his voting record on pertinent issues. Other groups in this field, such as the American College of Obstetricians and Gynecologists, gave Clyburn a rating of zero in 2014.

Despite his opposition to partial-birth abortion, Clyburn is regarded as pro-abortion rights, as shown by his high ratings from Planned Parenthood and NARAL Pro-Choice America and low rating from the National Right to Life Committee. But at the height of national polarization after the Supreme Court's intention to overturn Roe v. Wade had been leaked, Clyburn controversially campaigned on behalf of anti-abortion incumbent Representative Henry Cuellar, who faced a pro-choice primary challenger.

Education

Clyburn has continuously sought new and additional funding for education. He has gained additional funding for special education and lower interest rates on federal student loans. In many sessions Clyburn has sought, sponsored and/or voted for improvements in Pell Grant funding for college loans.

The National Education Association and the National Association of Elementary School Principals rate Clyburn very highly, as do other education interest groups.

Ports
Although he was criticized for a previous expenditure of 160 million dollars to expand South Carolina's ports, Clyburn said he would continue to make funding available for further expansions. The plan is to deepen the ports to allow for larger commercial ships to arrive from the Panama Canal, which is being expanded to allow for larger ships to pass through. This is primarily because of larger commercial ships from China, and China's extremely high demand for soybeans, which are produced in South Carolina but must be sent to larger ports for exporting. This measure will benefit South Carolina business and farmers and is thus heavily backed by these groups.

Labor
Clyburn has consistently voted for increases in minimum wage income and to restrict employer interference with labor union organization.

Many national labor unions, including the AFL–CIO, the United Auto Workers, the Communication Workers Association, and the International Brotherhood of Boilermakers, give Clyburn outstanding ratings based on his voting record on issues that pertain to labor and employment.

Environment

Clyburn has opposed legislation to increase offshore drilling for oil or natural gas. Instead, he has promoted use of nuclear energy as an cheaper alternative to fossil fuels than wind and solar energy. Members of the nuclear power industry have said that there is mutual respect between Clyburn and themselves. Clyburn pushed for a 2010 contract to convert plutonium from old weapons into nuclear fuel.

Organizations such as the League of Conservation Voters and Defenders of Wildlife have viewed Clyburn favorably, but he angered environmentalists when he proposed building a $150 million bridge across a swampy area of Lake Marion in Calhoun County.

Objection to the 2004 presidential election
Clyburn was one of 31 House Democrats who voted not to count Ohio's 20 electoral votes in the 2004 presidential election. George W. Bush won Ohio by 118,457 votes. Without Ohio's electoral votes, the election would have been decided by the U.S. House of Representatives, with each state having one vote in accordance with the Twelfth Amendment to the United States Constitution.

War in Iraq
On July 31, 2007, Clyburn said in a broadcast interview that it would be a "real big problem" for the Democratic Party if General David Petraeus issued a positive report in September, as it would split the Democratic caucus on whether to continue to fund the Iraq War. While this soundbite caused some controversy, the full quote was, in reference to the 47-member Blue Dog caucus, "I think there would be enough support in that group to want to stay the course and if the Republicans were to stay united as they have been, then it would be a problem for us."

Bill Clinton comments
Clyburn was officially neutral during the 2008 primary battle between Hillary Clinton and Barack Obama, but former President Bill Clinton blamed Clyburn for Hillary's 29-point defeat in the South Carolina primary and the two of them had a heated telephone conversation. Clyburn had voted for Obama, saying, "How could I ever look in the faces of our children and grandchildren had I not voted for Barack Obama?" He negatively viewed Bill Clinton's remarks about Obama winning the South Carolina primary. Clinton had compared Obama's victory to Jesse Jackson's win in the 1988 primary. "Black people are incensed all over this", Clyburn said. Clinton responded that the campaign "played the race card on me", denying any racial tone in the comment. Speaking to the New York Times, Clyburn said such actions could lead to a longtime division between Clinton and his once most reliable constituency. "When he was going through his impeachment problems, it was the black community that bellied up to the bar", Clyburn said. "I think black folks feel strongly that this is a strange way for President Clinton to show his appreciation."

Impeachment of Donald Trump
On December 18, 2019, Clyburn voted for both articles of impeachment against President Donald Trump.

Committee assignments
On April 2, 2020, Pelosi announced that Clyburn would chair the House Select Subcommittee on the Coronavirus Crisis.

 Joint Select Committee on Deficit Reduction (2011–2012)

Caucus memberships
 Congressional Black Caucus
 House Democratic Caucus 
United States Congressional International Conservation Caucus
 Congressional Arts Caucus
 Congressional Cement Caucus

Presidential endorsements

Clyburn is considered a power broker in South Carolina. For almost 30 years, he has hosted an annual fish fry "that every four years becomes a must-attend event for presidential hopefuls."

During the 2004 Democratic presidential primaries, Clyburn supported former House Minority Leader Dick Gephardt until he dropped out of the race and then supported John Kerry. Clyburn was one of the 31 who voted in the House not to count Ohio's electoral votes in the 2004 presidential election amid a dispute over irregularities.

Like other Democratic congressional leaders, Clyburn remained publicly uncommitted throughout most of the 2008 presidential primary elections. Despite being officially neutral, Clyburn voted for Obama in the South Carolina primary. Former President Bill Clinton accused Clyburn of being responsible for Hillary's 29-point defeat in South Carolina, while Clyburn criticized Bill Clinton's comments on race comparing Obama's win to that of Jesse Jackson. Clyburn endorsed Obama on June 3, immediately before the Montana and South Dakota primaries. By that time, Obama's lead in pledged delegates was substantial enough that those two primaries could not undo it.

Clyburn endorsed Hillary Clinton in the 2016 presidential campaign.

Clyburn's endorsement of Joe Biden on February 26, 2020, three days before the South Carolina primary, was considered pivotal in the 2020 Democratic presidential primaries. Several analyses have determined the endorsement changed the trajectory of the race, due to Clyburn's influence over the state's African-Americans, who make up the majority of its Democratic electorate. Until Clyburn's endorsement, Biden had not won a single primary and had placed fourth, fifth, and a distant second in the Iowa, New Hampshire, and Nevada caucuses and primaries, respectively. Three days after the South Carolina primary, Biden took a delegate lead on Super Tuesday, and a month later he clinched the nomination. Biden went on to win the 2020 Presidential election.

Political positions 
Clyburn identifies as a progressive, but thinks the Democratic Party's more liberal wing should be "practical". Various progressives have called him "conservative" and "centrist".

Israel 
In January 2017, Clyburn voted against a House resolution condemning the UN Security Council Resolution 2334, which called Israeli settlement building in the occupied Palestinian territories in the West Bank a "flagrant violation" of international law and a major obstacle to peace.

Homosexuality and same-sex marriage 
In 1996, Clyburn voted in favor of the Defense of Marriage Act, which at the time passed with majority Democratic support and near-unanimous Republican support. The act restricted federal recognition of marriage to the union of a man and a woman, and explicitly granted states the power to ban same-sex marriage and refuse to acknowledge same-sex marriages granted under the laws of other states. The House Judiciary Committee had explicitly said the act was meant to "express moral disapproval of homosexuality". The act passed by an 85-vote majority in the Senate and was signed into law by President Bill Clinton.

In 2012, after Obama's public endorsement of same-sex marriage, amid shifting public opinion of same-sex marriage, Clyburn said in an interview that he too supported marriage equality. In the interview, he said his former disapproval of same-sex marriage was rooted in his Christian faith, but that he had since "evolved". Clyburn called for nationwide legislation of marriage equality, opposing Obama's state-by-state approach, saying, "if you consider this to be a civil right—and I do—I don't think civil rights ought to be left up to a state-by-state approach".

During the 2020 Democratic presidential primaries, when considering an endorsement, Clyburn cited Pete Buttigieg's sexual orientation as an issue, saying it was "no question" that his sexuality would hurt his popularity and that "[he] knew a lot of people [his] age that felt that way." Clyburn added, "I'm not going to sit here and tell you otherwise, because I think everybody knows that's an issue." In the wake of his comments, then-candidate Kamala Harris dismissed his comments as "nonsense" and "a trope" of the African American community, but the Benson Strategy Group reported that "being gay was a barrier for these voters, particularly for the men who seemed uncomfortable discussing it."

Personal life

Clyburn was married to librarian Emily England Clyburn from 1961 until her death in 2019. They had three daughters; their eldest, Mignon Clyburn, was appointed to the Federal Communications Commission by President Barack Obama, and their second daughter, Jennifer Clyburn Reed, was appointed as federal co-chair of the newly formed Southeast Crescent Regional Commission.

See also 
 List of African-American United States representatives

References

Further reading 
 Thomas, Rhondda R. & Ashton, Susanna, eds. (2014). The South Carolina Roots of African American Thought. Columbia: University of South Carolina Press. "James E. Clyburn (b. 1940)," p. 273-278.

External links 

 Congressman James E. Clyburn official U.S. House website
 Office of the Majority Whip official leadership website
 Jim Clyburn for Congress
 

 
 GOP Agenda Is a Plague on Americans by Jim Clyburn, September 24, 2010

|-

|-

|-

|-

|-

|-

|-

|-

1940 births
20th-century Methodists
21st-century American politicians
African-American members of the United States House of Representatives
African-American Methodists
African-American people in South Carolina politics
African-American state cabinet secretaries
American Methodists
Methodists from South Carolina
Democratic Party members of the United States House of Representatives from South Carolina
Living people
Politicians from Columbia, South Carolina
People from Sumter, South Carolina
People of the African Methodist Episcopal church
South Carolina State University alumni
State cabinet secretaries of South Carolina
Clyburn family